Omar Efendi Mosque is a historical and architectural monument of the 19th century located in the city of Sheki, Azerbaijan.

History 
Built in the 19th century, the Omar Efendi Mosque has retained its original appearance to nowadays. After the Soviet occupation, the mosque's edifice was used as a warehouse. After 1950, the mosque resumed its activity. In 1986, the mosque burned down as a result of a natural disaster. In 1987, at the initiative of Juma Mosque's imam of Sheki - Haji Selim Efendi, as well as with the help of the donations made by the local residents, the mosque was renovated and restored.

The religious community of the Omar Efendi Mosque in Sheki was officially registered by the State Committee of the Republic of Azerbaijan for work with religious associations.

Description and architecture
The Omar Efendi Mosque has a rectangular shape. The brick cornice on the facade, as well as the walls between the windows, decorated with slightly protruding thin patterns, complement its architectural appearance.

The area of the mosque is 105 m2, the territory of the adjacent plot is 525 m2. Local building materials such as pebbles and burnt bricks were used in the construction of the mosque. The roof is covered with iron sheets, the floor and the ceiling are made of wood.

There is an open balcony in the front of the mosque's entrance door. The worshipers perform the ablution in the pool located in the courtyard of the mosque, and then go to the spacious
and bright hall to pray. The main prayer hall has 14 windows. In the front of the main prayer hall is an even larger prayer room, with a total area of 80 m2, 45 of which are given to women, and the rest is used as a corridor.

The minbar (tribune) of the mosque is made of wood and is decorated with elegant hand-made designs. The height of the mihrab, decorated with floral ornaments, is three meters.

The minaret of the mosque, also built of burnt bricks, has a rounded shape. Its height is 14 m. The brick patterns of the minaret, which is part of the main complex of the mosque, emphasize the skill of the master.

Gallery

See also 
 Imam Ali Mosque
 Shaki Khans' Mosque
 Gilahli Mosque in Sheki

References

External links

 Şəki Ömər Əfəndi Məscidi. Doğma Azərbaycanım verilişi.

Mosques in Shaki
Monuments and memorials in Azerbaijan